John Saul (born February 25, 1942) is an American author of suspense and horror novels.  Most of his books have appeared on the New York Times Best Seller List.

Biography

Born in Pasadena, Saul grew up in Whittier, California, and graduated from Whittier High School in 1959.  He went on to several colleges, including Cerritos College, Antioch College, San Francisco State University and Montana State University, variously majoring in anthropology, liberal arts and theater, but remains degree-less.  After leaving college, Saul decided to become a writer, and spent 15 years working in various jobs while learning his craft.

Prior to the start of his bestselling thriller career, Saul had around 10 books published under pen names, the first of which he wrote in one weekend after unexpectedly losing his job. His first book sale earned him just $200. Today he has over 60 million books in print.

In 1976, Dell Publishing contacted him about his writing a psychological thriller.  The resulting novel, Suffer the Children, appeared on all the bestseller lists in the United States and reached the number one spot in Canada. In addition to his novels, Saul has had several one-act plays produced in Los Angeles and Seattle.

Saul lives part-time in the Pacific Northwest, both in Seattle and in the San Juan Islands, and has a residence on the Big Island of Hawaii. Saul is openly gay. He lives with his partner of 43 years, who has collaborated on several of his novels. He is a frequent speaker at the Maui Writers' Conference.

His 1979 novel Cry for the Strangers was made into a 1982 TV movie starring Patrick Duffy and Cindy Pickett.

Works

Novels

References 

John Saul: A Critical Companion by Paul Bail

External links
 http://www.johnsaul.com/
 

1942 births
Living people
writers from Pasadena, California
Writers from Whittier, California
American horror writers
American thriller writers
Antioch College alumni
American gay writers
Writers from California
American LGBT novelists
LGBT people from California
LGBT people from Washington (state)
American male novelists